Semigorye is a rural locality (a village) in Staroselskoye Rural Settlement, Vologodsky District, Vologda Oblast, Russia. The population was 14 as of 2002.

Geography 
Semigorye is located 65 km west of Vologda (the district's administrative centre) by road. Lumba is the nearest rural locality.

References 

Rural localities in Vologodsky District